Events in the year 2018 in Ivory Coast.

Incumbents
 President: Alassane Ouattara
 Prime Minister: Amadou Gon Coulibaly

Events
24 March – scheduled date for the Ivorian senatorial election, 2018

Deaths

12 February – Jean-Jacques Béchio, politician (b. 1949).

27 May – Jean Konan Banny, politician (b. 1929).

2 December – Séry Bailly, writer and politician, Minister of Communication (b. 1948).

References

 
2010s in Ivory Coast 
Years of the 21st century in Ivory Coast 
Ivory Coast 
Ivory Coast